Potamorhina is a genus of toothless characin from South America, with these currently described species:
 Potamorhina altamazonica (Cope, 1878)
 Potamorhina laticeps (Valenciennes, 1850)
 Potamorhina latior (Spix & Agassiz, 1829)
 Potamorhina pristigaster (Steindachner, 1876)
 Potamorhina squamoralevis (Braga & Azpelicueta, 1983)

References
 

Curimatidae
Taxa named by Edward Drinker Cope
Fish of South America